Ralph Williams (born March 27, 1958) is a former American football offensive lineman who played four seasons in the National Football League with the Houston Oilers and New Orleans Saints. He played college football at Southern University and attended West Monroe High School in West Monroe, Louisiana. He was also member of the San Antonio Gunslingers of the United States Football League.

References

External links
Just Sports Stats

Living people
1958 births
Players of American football from Louisiana
American football offensive linemen
Southern Jaguars football players
Houston Oilers players
San Antonio Gunslingers players
New Orleans Saints players
Sportspeople from Monroe, Louisiana